Eva Ngui Nchama (born 9 June 1985) is a Paralympian athlete from Spain competing mainly in category T12 sprint events.  She has competed at three Paralympic Games, 2004 Summer Paralympics, 2008 Summer Paralympics and 2012 Summer Paralympics, and earned a pair bronze medals, both coming at the 2008 Games

Personal 
Ngui was born in Malabo, Equatorial Guinea.  She has albinism, a condition she has had since birth.  She moved to Spain in 2003, where she lived in Hospitalet de Llobregat and continued to reside there in 2008.

Athletics 
Ngui is a Paralympian athlete from Spain competing mainly in category T12 sprint events, who started competing in track and field in 2001.  She is a member of ISS L'Hospitalet Atletisme, an athletic club in L'Hospitalet.

Around 2008, Ngui spent a year training at the High Performance Centre in Madrid.  At that time, she was coached by Manuel Pascua Piqueras. She competed in the 2011 Spanish national championships in Vizcaya. She qualified for and competed in the 2011 IPC Athletics World Championships where she was one of thirty-two competitors representing Spain. Competing at the actual event, she won a bronze medal in the T12 100 meter event.

In 2012, Ngui was a recipient of a Plan ADO €18,000 athlete scholarship with a €3,000 reserve and a €2,500 coaching scholarship. In May 2012, she competed at the Paralympic World Cup in Manchester, earning a third-place finish in the 100 meters and another in the 200 meters. Prior to the start of the London Games, she trained with several other visually impaired Spanish track and field athletes in Logroño. In the lead up to the London Paralympics, in July 2012, she competed in a Diamond League race at the Crystal Palace National Sports Centre in London.  In May 2013, she competed in the Spanish national championships, where she earned gold medals in the 100 and 200 meter events. In July 2013, she participated in the 2013 IPC Athletics World Championships.

Paralympics 
Ngui competed in the 2004 Summer Paralympics in Athens, Greece.  There she went out in the semi-finals of the women's 100 metres — T12 event  She also competed at the 2008 Summer Paralympics in Beijing, China.    There she won a bronze medal in the women's 100 metres — T12 event and a bronze medal in the women's 200 metres — T12 event. Her 200-meter bronze medal came after the Spanish delegation complained that the Angolan runner Evalina Alexandre who finished ahead of her had been assisted by her guide in a way that violated the rules. Upon review, race officials agreed and then award Ngui bronze.
 She raced at the 2012 Summer Paralympics and was the 14th runner to finish.

References

External links 
 
 

1985 births
Living people
Spanish disability athletes
Paralympic athletes of Spain
Paralympic bronze medalists for Spain
Visually impaired sprinters
Paralympic medalists in athletics (track and field)
Athletes (track and field) at the 2004 Summer Paralympics
Athletes (track and field) at the 2008 Summer Paralympics
Athletes (track and field) at the 2012 Summer Paralympics
Medalists at the 2008 Summer Paralympics
Plan ADOP alumni
Sportspeople from Malabo
Equatoguinean emigrants to Spain
Naturalised citizens of Spain
Spanish sportspeople of Equatoguinean descent
Spanish female sprinters
Paralympic sprinters
Spanish blind people